Albans may refer to:

 Italic Albans, ancient people in the region of Latium, Italy
 Caucasian Albans, inhabitants of ancient Caucasian Albania
 Albans Wood, a nature reserve in Watford, Hertfordshire (UK)
 Albans (fictional people), thus named in The Alban Quest (1998)

See also 
 St. Albans (disambiguation)
 Albanians (disambiguation)